Azim Azarov (born 20 September 1996 in Bishkek) is a Kyrgyz professional footballer who plays as a midfielder for Alga Bishkek, and the Kyrgyzstan national team.

Club career
Azarov has played domestically for Dordoi Bishkek, Ala-Too Naryn,  Ilbirs Bishkek, and Alga Bishkek.

International career
Azarov appeared for the Kyrgyzstan under-23 team in two of its matches during the 2018 Asian Games. In August 2021 he was named to the senior team's preliminary squad for matches the following month. He made his senior international debut on 2 September 2021 in a 2021 Three Nations Cup friendly against Palestine. He went on to score his first international goal in the match, Kyrgyzstan's eventual game-winner in the 1–0 victory.

Career statistics

International goals
Scores and results list Kyrgyzstan's goal tally first.

International career statistics

References

External links
 
 
 

1996 births
Living people
Kyrgyzstani footballers
Kyrgyzstan international footballers
Association football forwards
FC Dordoi Bishkek players
FC Alga Bishkek players